Page Airport may refer to:

 Page Airport (FAA: 9W2) in Walla Walla, Washington, United States
 Page Field (FAA: FMY) in Fort Myers, Florida, United States
 Page Municipal Airport (FAA: PGA) in Page, Arizona, United States
 Page Regional Airport (FAA: 64G) in Page, North Dakota, United States		
 Clarence E. Page Municipal Airport (FAA: RCE) in Oklahoma City, Oklahoma, United States